The 2022 Alabama gubernatorial election took place on November 8, 2022, to elect the governor of Alabama. Incumbent Republican Governor Kay Ivey took office on April 10, 2017, upon the resignation of former Governor Robert J. Bentley, and was elected to a full term in 2018. She ran for re-election to a second full term in which she won her re-election bid in a landslide. 

Primary elections in Alabama were held on May 24. Runoff elections for instances where no candidate received 50% plus one vote were scheduled for June 21. A runoff was avoided in the Republican primary, with Ivey winning outright. The Democratic primary advanced to a runoff between Malika Sanders-Fortier and Yolanda Flowers, with Flowers winning the Democratic nomination.

Voter turnout for the 2022 midterm elections in Alabama dropped significantly from 2018, with only 38.5% of Alabama's registered voters turning out. This turnout was far below the 2020 presidential election in Alabama, which saw a turnout of 63.1%. Alabama's neighboring state Tennessee also saw a huge drop in voter turnout this midterm cycle as well, with only 38.6% of Tennesseans turning out to vote.

This was the first gubernatorial election in Alabama history in which both major party nominees were women. Flowers was also the first Black female gubernatorial nominee in Alabama. Governor Ivey was sworn in for her second full term on January 16, 2023. 

This is the only gubernatorial election in the 2020s to date to be won by a member of the Silent Generation.

Republican primary

Candidates

Nominee
 Kay Ivey, incumbent Governor of Alabama

Eliminated in primary
 Lynda Blanchard, former United States Ambassador to Slovenia (2019–2021) and former candidate for U.S. Senate in 2022
 Lew Burdette, president of women and youth shelter King's Home in Chelsea
 Stacy Lee George, corrections officer, former Morgan County commissioner, and candidate for governor in 2014 and 2018
 Tim James, businessman, son of former Governor Fob James, and candidate for governor in 2002 and 2010
 Donald Trent Jones, yoga instructor
 Dean Odle, pastor, author, founder and dean of a ministry school
 Dave Thomas, mayor of Springville (2020–present) and former state representative (1994–2002)
 Dean Young, businessman and perennial candidate

Declined
 Will Ainsworth, incumbent Lieutenant Governor of Alabama (seeking re-election)
 Mo Brooks, U.S. Representative (running for U.S. Senate)
 Steve Marshall, incumbent Attorney General of Alabama (seeking re-election)
 Rick Pate, incumbent commissioner of Alabama Department of Agriculture and Industries (seeking re-election)
 Jim Zeigler, incumbent Alabama State Auditor (2015–present) (formed exploratory committee but did not run; running for Secretary of State)

Endorsements

Debates and forums
The first Republican debate forum was held on January 19, 2022, in Ozark. It was hosted by the Coffee County Republican Women organization at the Enterprise Country Club. The debate featured candidates Lynda Blanchard, Tim James, and Dean Odle. Incumbent Governor Kay Ivey was not present, and candidate Lew Burdette phoned in due to being in isolation with COVID-19. Odle detailed his opinion of the governor's mishandling of the COVID-19 pandemic, while James talked about a culture war on Alabamians and Blanchard signaled her broad agreement with the other candidates. Each candidate was against opening a statewide lottery but were open to let the voters decide the issue.

A second candidate forum was held at the monthly Republican Women of Huntsville luncheon on February 1, 2022 at The Ledges Country Club in Huntsville. Blanchard, Burdette, James, and Odle were in attendance.

The third major forum for Republican gubernatorial candidates was held on February 10, 2022, in Fairhope. It was hosted by the Eastern Shore Republican Women organization at the Fairhope Yacht Club, and was moderated by radio show host Jeff Poor. All candidates except for incumbent Governor Kay Ivey, who was holding her own campaign event, and Stacy Lee George, who had a scheduling conflict, were in attendance. The candidates were universal in their opposition towards a recent fuel tax increase, in particular criticizing possible future increases. According to AL.com, Young was nearly removed from the forum after he entered into an argument with a representative of the hosts, concerning a challenge he had submitted regarding Ivey's appearance on the ballot. Young later accused the Eastern Shore Republican Women of not wanting him to "talk bad" about Ivey. The candidates also expressed opposition towards gambling in the state, though Blanchard and Thomas stated that the decision should be left in the hands of voters. Regarding education, James pushed for pay bonuses for principals tied to school performance, while Jones advocated for yoga instruction in schools.

Also on February 10, 2022, the Houston County Republican Party group held a GOP candidates forum at the Wiregrass Rehab Center in Dothan. The forum featured Blanchard, James and Odle giving stump speeches, along with candidates for U.S. Senate, AL-02, and the Alabama Supreme Court, among other state and local offices.

The Butler County Republican Party organization held a GOP candidates forum on February 28, 2022 at the Wendell Mitchell Conference Center on the campus of Lurleen B. Wallace Community College in Greenville. The forum was attended by candidates Blanchard, Burdette, James, and Odle. It also hosted candidates for U.S. Senate, Secretary of State, and the Alabama Supreme Court.

The Athens-Limestone Republican Women Organization held a gubernatorial debate forum at the Valley Event Center on U.S. Highway 72 in Athens on March 7, 2022. Only Blanchard, James and Odle participated; Ivey and the rest of the candidates were absent. James emphasized education reform and criticized gas taxes in the state, while Blanchard targeted illegal immigration and benefits given to non-citizens. Odle centered on COVID-19 related issues, and praised Florida governor Ron DeSantis as a model for governing by rejecting President Joe Biden's decisions.

1819 News, Eagle Forum of Alabama, Thatcher Coalition, and LOCAL Alabama held a joint gubernatorial debate forum featuring Republican candidates Blanchard, Burdette, James, Odle, and Thomas as well as the entire Democratic primary field at the Hoover Library Theatre on March 10, 2022. All candidates were invited, though only those eleven participated.

The forum was structured into four segments: one for opening remarks, the second for answering policy questions, followed by a lightning round by writing "yes" or "no" on a small whiteboard, and the last being closing statements. Lindy Blanchard opined about her service to Donald Trump as United States Ambassador to Slovenia as the driver behind her run for governor, while Lew Burdette described Alabama as "the bottom of the list" in almost every quality of life category and the need to limit campaign financing as possible policy solutions. Dean Odle berated Kay Ivey's handling of COVID-19, but also stated the intentions of Klaus Schwab and the World Economic Forum would have an effect on the state level and as a result there was a dire need for electing new leadership. Tim James spoke fondly of Eagle Forum's ardent opposition of the Equal Rights Amendment in 1975 as a reflection of the current state of affairs. Dave Thomas outlined the "professional politicians" and "self-proclaimed elite" once again running for Governor as the catalyst for his entrance into the race.

When moderator Allison Sinclair posed the question "If you could choose one song that was the theme song for your life, what would it be?", the candidates had a variety of answers. Lindy Blanchard's answer was "It Is Well With My Soul", and Lew Burdette's was "Amazing Grace". Tim James answered the opening theme from Patton, and Dave Thomas cited the title song from "I'm Not the Devil" by Cody Jinks. Dean Odle's answer was "Crushing Snakes" by Crowder.

The Cullman County Republican Women hosted a gubernatorial candidate forum at VFW post 2214 in Cullman on April 12, 2022. The Cullman Times noted that while all the candidates agreed on most policy, the candidates each detailed solutions to different issues. Tim James decried the Alabama Legislature for not passing tax cuts after having a surplus of $1.5 billion, and Lindy Blanchard showed up in a Maga hat to show that she was more loyal to Donald Trump than anyone else there. Dave Thomas cited his experience as mayor of Springville and previous campaign battles as giving him a leg up on the competition, and Lew Burdette called for an overhaul of campaign finance laws. In addition to citing Governor Kay Ivey's COVID-19 lockdown of Alabama that violated the United States Constitution, Dean Odle's plan for drafting school choice legislation was described as "perhaps the most autonomous state education policy proposal for Alabama communities".

Grassroots conservative group Focus on America will hosted a Republican gubernatorial debate on April 26, 2022, at the Roto Rooter Event Center on Paramount Drive in Huntsville. Six of the candidates showed up; Ivey, George and Young again remained absent.

According to 1819 News,
The closest thing to a heated disagreement during the debate came when Dean Odle accused Burdette of “basically giving my speech points” from one of Odle’s first television campaign commercials that described how Florida had seen the national ranking of Sunshine State K-12 schools rapidly rise from 29th to third after they eliminated the Common Core program there. Odle said he overheard Burdette “doing what a politician does” by using the points made by Odle in his commercial while talking to a member of the media inside of the Event Center prior to the debate." Burdette fired back by telling the audience, “I don’t follow Dean Odle, so if he has a commercial that I haven’t seen, I’m sorry that I haven’t seen your commercial. I don’t know if anybody else here has seen his commercial, nor do I follow your campaign particularly closely. We’ve been in a lot of these gubernatorial forums, these are all things that we’ve shared at each one of them, and I don’t even remember, Dean, you sharing that statistic.”

With one exception, all the candidates vying for victory in the May 24th Republican Primary checked most of the boxes on issues that concern Alabama conservative voters. The only exception was Montevallo’s Donald Trent Jones who wore John Lennon-style, amber-tinted eyeglasses, a beauty contest style white sash with the Alabama state flag and the word GOVERNOR printed across it, and a black jacket covered with colorful 1960s symbols, such as butterflies, stars, hearts, peace symbols, guitars, and other symbols of the hippie era. Jones introduced himself by proclaiming, “I am your Yoga Governor.” Other than suggesting that Alabama could help stop election day fraud by dipping the fingers of voters in indelible ink so that they couldn’t vote more than once, Jones managed to work his yoga philosophy into almost every one of his question responses and statements. When asked if that was his motivation for running for governor, Jones admitted that his candidacy was only a ploy to promote his not-for-profit yoga enterprise.

Four of the Republican candidates for Governor showed up for a Q&A session following the candidate forum being held at the Doster Center in Prattville by the Autauga County Republican Executive Committee.

The Mid Alabama Republican Club hosted a gubernatorial debate at its May monthly meeting, which took place at the Vestavia Hills Public Library on May 14 at 9:00 AM. Four of the candidates for governor appeared at this forum.

Polling
Graphical summary

Aggregate polls

Primary results

Democratic primary

Candidates

Nominee
 Yolanda Rochelle Flowers, activist, retired rehabilitation specialist and educator

Eliminated in runoff
 Malika Sanders-Fortier, attorney and state senator from the 23rd district (2018–present)

Eliminated in primary
 Arthur Kennedy, Army veteran and educator
 Chad "Chig" Martin, small business owner, musician and independent candidate for governor in 2018 (switched from independent)
 Patricia Salter Jamieson, nurse and licensed minister
 Doug "New Blue" Smith, developmental economist, retired corporate attorney and perennial candidate

Failed to qualify
Christopher A. Countryman, equality activist, licensed minister, motivational speaker, former juvenile corrections officer and candidate for governor in 2018

Declined
 Walt Maddox, mayor of Tuscaloosa and nominee for governor in 2018

Endorsements

First round

Debates and forums
All six of the Democratic candidates for governor were present at the LOCAL Alabama gubernatorial candidate forum on March 10, 2022, at the Hoover Library Theatre in Hoover, facing off against 5 of the Republican candidates.

The forum was structured into four segments: one for opening remarks, the second for answering policy questions, followed by a lightning round by writing "yes" or "no" on a small whiteboard, and the last being closing statements. Speaking before a bipartisan audience, Arthur Kennedy cited his service in the United States Army as a calling to run for governor. Chad Martin called for the government to be more proactive in alleviating burdens of Alabama citizens, including those in the education sector. Patricia Salter Jamieson outlined the need for unity between Alabamians of all backgrounds. Malika Sanders-Fortier cited the need for more citizens to be involved in the political process. Yolanda Flowers offered her vision for the state as a "different aspect" than the current leadership. Doug Smith kicked things off by brandishing several large print graphs of the seven economic engines that he believed, if reimplemented, would propel the Alabama economy while going well over his allotted answer time.

When moderator Allison Sinclair posed the question "If you could choose one song that was the theme song for your life, what would it be?", the candidates had a variety of answers. Smith's immediate response was "Precious Lord, Take My Hand", while Flowers said hers would be "The Sound of Music". Kennedy's theme song was "I Can Win", while Jamieson cited "Amazing Grace" and Martin said "Simple Man" by Lynyrd Skynyrd. Malika Sanders-Fortier decided that her song was "Be Still" by Hillsong Worship.

A Democratic candidate forum, featuring office-seekers from gubernatorial, U.S. Senate and AL-04 races in Alabama, was held in Fort Payne on April 7, 2022. This event was more of a meet-and-greet rather than a traditional candidate forum.

The Houston County Democratic Party hosted a Democratic candidate forum for gubernatorial, AL-02 and other races in Dothan at the Clarion Inn at meetings on April 21 and 22 of 2022. Yolanda Flowers addressed the group on Thursday evening while the other five candidates spoke the following day.

Polling

Results

Runoff

Results

Independent and third-party candidates

Libertarian nomination
No primary was held for the Libertarian Party, and candidates were instead nominated by the party.

Nominee
 James "Jimmy" Blake, former Birmingham city councilman and former chair of the Libertarian Party of Alabama

Independent candidates

Declared
 Jared Budlong, marketing project manager (write-in campaign)
 Dean Odle, pastor, author and former Republican primary candidate (write-in campaign)

General election

Predictions

Endorsements

Polling

Results

See also
2022 United States Senate election in Alabama
2022 United States House of Representatives elections in Alabama
2022 United States gubernatorial elections
2022 Alabama lieutenant gubernatorial election
2022 Alabama Senate election
2022 Alabama House of Representatives election
2022 Alabama elections

Notes

Partisan clients

References

External links
Official campaign websites
 Kay Ivey (R) for Governor
 Yolanda Flowers (D) for Governor

Alabama gubernatorial elections
Gubernatorial
Alabama